A fermentation crock, also known as a gärtopf crock or Harsch crock, is a crock for fermentation.  It has a gutter in the rim which is then filled with water so that when the top is put on an airlock is created, which prevents the food within from spoiling due to the development of surface molds.  Ceramic weights may also be used to keep the fermenting food inside submerged.

See also 
 Sauerkraut

External links
Image with cross-section through crock

Cooking vessels
Fermentation